Ross Grabel (born 1950) is an American bridge player. He is from Huntington Beach, California.

Bridge accomplishments

Wins

 North American Bridge Championships (5)
 von Zedtwitz Life Master Pairs (1) 2013 
 Grand National Teams (1) 1998 
 Jacoby Open Swiss Teams (1) 1982 
 Mitchell Board-a-Match Teams (1) 1980 
 Reisinger (1) 1984

Runners-up

 North American Bridge Championships
 Spingold (1) 1989

Notes

American contract bridge players
Living people
1950 births
Place of birth missing (living people)
Date of birth missing (living people)
People from Huntington Beach, California